James Royce Sharp (born May 25, 1972) is an American former competition swimmer who represented the United States at the 1992 Summer Olympics in Barcelona, Spain.  Sharp competed in the preliminary heats of the men's 200-meter backstroke, and finished with the eighteenth-best time overall (2:00.97).  His winning time in the U.S. Olympic Trials was over two seconds faster, and the equivalent time would have won a medal in Barcelona.

See also
 List of University of Michigan alumni
 List of World Aquatics Championships medalists in swimming (men)

References

1972 births
Living people
American male backstroke swimmers
Michigan Wolverines men's swimmers
Olympic swimmers of the United States
People from Houston
Swimmers at the 1992 Summer Olympics
World Aquatics Championships medalists in swimming
20th-century American people
21st-century American people